Days of Being Wild is a 1990 Hong Kong drama film written and directed by Wong Kar-wai. Starring some of the best-known actors and actresses in Hong Kong, including Leslie Cheung, Andy Lau, Maggie Cheung, Carina Lau, Jacky Cheung and Tony Leung, the film marks the first collaboration between Wong and cinematographer Christopher Doyle, with whom he has since made six more films.

It forms the first part of an informal trilogy, together with In the Mood for Love (2000) and 2046 (2004).

Plot
The movie begins in 1960 Hong Kong.

Yuddy, a smooth-talking playboy seduces Li-zhen but is uninterested in pursuing a serious relationship with her. Li-zhen, who wants to marry him, is heartbroken and decides to leave. Yuddy moves on to a new relationship with vivacious cabaret dancer Mimi. His friend Zeb is also attracted to her but she doesn't reciprocate his feelings.

Yuddy has a tense relationship with his adoptive mother Rebecca, a former prostitute, after she reveals that he is adopted. He also doesn't approve of her choice of lovers much younger than her who he thinks are taking advantage of her. She initially refuses to reveal who his birth mother is but eventually relents and tells him that she lives in the Philippines.

Li-zhen finds solace in Tide, a policeman who does his rounds near Yuddy's house. Tide dreams of becoming a sailor but he chooses to be a policeman to stay and look after his mother. Li-zhen talks about her failed love affair, her successful cousin's impending marriage and how she misses home. Li-zhen, who works at the ticket stall of a soccer stadium, promises Tide a free ticket to a match of his choice and Tide tells her to call him on a phone booth he passes every night if she ever needs anyone to talk to. Their near-romance is hinted at but never materializes. When his mother passes, Tide leaves to become a sailor.

Meanwhile, Yuddy decides to find his birth mother and leaves for the Philippines, giving his car to Zeb and without informing Mimi. Mimi is distraught and resolves to follow him. Zeb, his love still unrequited, sells Yuddy's car to finance her trip and asks her to come back to him if she doesn't find Yuddy. Yuddy finds his mother's house but she refuses to see him.

Tide, now a sailor on a stopover in the Philippines, finds a drunk Yuddy passed out on the street and brings him to his hotel room. Yuddy doesn't recognise him but accepts his assistance. He gets into a fight at the railway station over payment for an American passport and stabs a man. Tide saves him and they escape aboard a train. Tide asks him if he remembers what happened on a particular date to an exact minute, referring to something he told Li-zhen at the start of their courtship. He says that he remembers and tells him it would be best to tell Li-zhen that he doesn't. Tide returns from a conversation with the train conductor to find Yuddy shot to death.

A final sequence shows Mimi having arrived in the Philippines, Li-zhen closing up at the ticket stall and a phone at the booth ringing.

The movie ends with a shot of a slick young man, smoking and readying himself in a darkened room.

Cast and roles
 Leslie Cheung as Yuddy
 Andy Lau as Tide, Policeman 6117, who becomes a friend and confidant of Su Li-zhen and later, after the death of his mother, he becomes a sailor and goes to the Philippines
 Maggie Cheung as Su Lizhen, who grew up in Macau and is the ex-girlfriend of Yuddy
 Carina Lau as Leung Fung-ying, Mimi/Lulu, the girlfriend of Yuddy
 Rebecca Pan as Rebecca, a former prostitute who raises Yuddy, has a love-and-hate relationship with Yuddy, because she refuses to reveal the identity of Yuddy's biological mother
 Jacky Cheung as Zeb, Yuddy's friend since childhood; Yuddy used to live above Zeb's family's garage as a kid; Zeb fancies Mimi/Lulu
 Danilo Antunes as Rebecca's lover, who only goes for her money
 Hung Mei-mei as the Amah
 Ling Ling-hung as Nurse
 Tita Muñoz as Yuddy's Mother
 Alicia Alonzo as Housekeeper
 Elena Lim So as Hotel Manager
 Maritoni Fernandez as Hotel Maid
 Angela Ponos as Prostitute
 Nonong Talbo as Train Conductor
 Tony Leung Chiu-wai as Gambler

Music
 Los Indios Tabajaras, "Always in My Heart"
 Xavier Cugat, "Perfidia", "María Elena" and "Jungle Drums"
 Leslie Cheung performed the song 何去何從之阿飛正傳 loosely translated as 'Choice' or 'The True Story of Ah Fei' as the film's theme song and it is also found in his album Beloved (寵愛).
 梅豔芳 (Anita Mui) – 是這樣的 – the Cantonese cover of the theme song and is featured at the end of the film during the credits.

Box office
Days of Being Wild grossed HK$9,751,942 in its Hong Kong run, a number that would become typical for a Wong Kar Wai film. With the starry cast, this figure was considered a disappointment. Still, the film was successful enough to warrant a parody (The Days of Being Dumb, which also featured Tony Leung and Jacky Cheung), and now routinely tops Hong Kong critics' lists of the best local productions.

Reception
On review aggregator Rotten Tomatoes, the film has an approval rating of 91% based on 32 reviews, with an average rating of 7.70/10. The website's critical consensus reads, "Days of Being Wild uses a young man's struggle to come to terms with a family secret as the foundation for a beautifully filmed drama with a darkly dreamy allure". On Metacritic, the film has a weighted average score of 93 out of 100 based on 21 critic reviews, indicating "universal acclaim".

The film ranked at number three on the Hong Kong Film Awards Association (HKFAA)'s 2005 list of The Best 100 Chinese Motion Pictures. It placed at number 37 on the "Asian Cinema 100 List" at the 20th Busan International Film Festival in 2015.

Home media
The film debuted on the Blu-ray format for the first time in the United States on March 23, 2021 in a collection of 7 Wong Kar-wai films by the Criterion Collection.

Awards and nominations

See also
 Leslie Cheung filmography
 Andy Lau filmography
 Jacky Cheung filmography
 Cinema of Hong Kong
 Christopher Doyle
 List of movies set in Hong Kong
 List of Hong Kong films
 Alan Tang

References

External links

 
 
 
 
 Promotional website for US region

1990 films
1990 drama films
Hong Kong New Wave films
Hong Kong drama films
1990s Cantonese-language films
Films directed by Wong Kar-wai
Best Film HKFA
Films whose director won the Best Director Golden Horse Award
Films set in 1960
Films set in Hong Kong
Films set in the Philippines
Films shot in the Philippines
1990s Hong Kong films